Gagodar is a village in Gujarat, India. It is located in the Rapar block of Kachchh district, and is administered by a panchayat.

References

Villages in Kutch district